Kendo Rage, known in Japan as , is an action video game for the Super Nintendo Entertainment System/Super Famicom by Datam Polystar. Seta U.S.A. published the English version.

Gameplay
It is a 2D action side scrolling game.

Plot
The original Japanese version of the game stars a girl named . A spirit detective named Doro (ドロ) finds Mai and asks her to help him attack monsters.

In the English-language version of the game, an American girl named Josephine "Jo" goes to Japan to attend a summer kendo school. Her personal trainer, Osaki "Bob" Yoritomo, asks her to fight monsters on the way to school.

Release
Makeruna! Makendō was released for the Super Famicom on January 22, 1993. An OVA series, Makeruna! Makendo, closely follows the original Japanese version of the game, featuring both Mai and her younger sister Hikari (the main character from the second game).

It was released in North America as Kendo Rage in October 1993 and published by Seta U.S.A.

A fighting game follow-up titled Makeruna! Makendō 2: Kimero Youkai Souri was released for the Super Famicom and PlayStation. A role-playing video game titled Makeruna! Makendō Z was released for the PC-FX.

Reception 

Famitsu gave the game a score of 24 out of 40.

See also

 Valis series

References

1993 video games
1995 anime OVAs
Action video games
Affect (company) games
Datam Polystar
Kadokawa Dwango franchises
OVAs based on video games
SETA Corporation games
Super Nintendo Entertainment System games
Super Nintendo Entertainment System-only games
Video games developed in Japan
Video games featuring female protagonists
Video games set in Japan
Single-player video games
Magical girl video games